Chūshingura: Hana no Maki, Yuki no Maki (Chushingura: Story of Flower, Story of Snow) is a 1962 Japanese jidaigeki epic film directed by Hiroshi Inagaki, with special effects by Eiji Tsuburaya. Produced and distributed by Toho Studios, it is based on the story of the forty-seven rōnin. The film stars Toshiro Mifune as Genba Tawaraboshi, along with Matsumoto Hakuō I, Yūzō Kayama, Tatsuya Mihashi, Akira Takarada, Yosuke Natsuki, Makoto Satō, and Tadao Takashima.

Chūshingura: Hana no Maki, Yuki no Maki was released theatrically in Japan on 3 November 1962. It was released under the title 47 Samurai in the United States.

Plot
The ruling shōgun Tokugawa Tsunayoshi placed Asano Takumi-no-kami Naganori, the daimyō of Akō, in charge of reception of envoys from the Imperial Court in Kyoto. He also appointed the protocol official (kōke) Kira Kōzuke-no-suke Yoshinaka to instruct Asano in the ceremonies. Asano is young and idealistic and does not understand various court protocols accepted in medieval Japan concerning the back-and-forth payments of officials for larger and lesser favors. Asano only sees these payments as a corrupt form of hand-outs and, worse in his idealistic perspective, as a corruption of government and its just operation. Asano decides to boycott the payment of any 'tithes' to anyone for any reason. Kira is instructed to take notice of this and decides to teach the young Asano a lesson in manners and customs by withholding commonly expected courtesies to rebuke him. Kira is hoping that Asano will become part of the 'tithing' expectations of government officials in the Tokugawa realm.

These 'tithing' expectations weigh heavily on the young Asano, and the intentional withdrawal of common courtesies from him by court officials make him emotionally agitated and unstable. On the day of the reception, at Edo Castle, Asano draws his short sword and attempts to kill Kira. His reasoning appears to lack all decorum of court, but many purport that an insult may have provoked him. For this act, he is sentenced to commit seppuku, but Kira does not receive any punishment. The shogunate confiscates Asano's lands (the Akō Domain) and dismisses all the samurai who had served him, making them rōnin. When their lord is forced to commit ritual suicide, forty-seven of his samurai await the chance to avenge their master and reclaim their honor.

Cast

Production
Film critic and historian Stuart Galbraith IV wrote that the film featured "complex billing" which featured "virtually everyone under contract to [Toho] at this time.". The film was shot in Eastmancolor.

Release
Chushingura was distributed by Toho in Japan on November 3, 1962. The film was Toho's fourth highest-grossing film of 1962 and was the 10th highest-grossing film in Japan that year.

The film was released by Toho International with English subtitles and an English narration by Michael Higgins with a 108-minute running time on October 10, 1963. This version was later cut to 100 minutes for its release in New York. In 1965, the Berkeley Cinema Guild acquired the distribution rights to the film and showed the full version (in two parts), under the title 47 Ronin, at the Cinema Theatre in Berkeley, California for 41 weeks before distributing the film in New York. It was reissued in 1966 with a 207-minute running time in the United States. It was later re-issued by East-West Classics with subtitles at a 208-minute running time.

See also
 List of Japanese films of 1962
 Historical period drama films set in Asia

References

Footnotes

Sources

External links

1962 films
Films about the Forty-seven Ronin
Films directed by Hiroshi Inagaki
Films produced by Tomoyuki Tanaka
Films produced by Sanezumi Fujimoto
Films scored by Akira Ifukube
Jidaigeki films
Samurai films
1962 martial arts films
1960s Japanese films